Men's 3 metre synchro springboard event at the 2019 European Diving Championships was contested on 10 August.

Results
11 pairs of athletes participated at the single-round event.

References

M